Ponif Vaz (born 4 October 1992) is an Indian professional footballer who plays as a defender for Real Kashmir in the I-League.

Career 
Ponif joined Sesa Football Academy at 16 and has got years of experience playing in the Goa Professional League. The highlight of his career was winning the Gold Medal at the 2014 Lusophony Games with the Goa-India team. Ponif started his youth career with Salcete FC and has been part of the Goa football team for Santosh Trophy for the years. In 2015 after sesa withdraw their first team  vaz jointed sporting goa.

He made his professional debut for the Churchill Brothers at Fatorda Stadium against Punjab F.C. on 1 December 2019, He started and played full match as Churchill Brothers won 3–0.

Career statistics

Club

Honour

Goa lusophony 
2014 Lusophony Games (1)

References

1992 births
Living people
People from Margao
Indian footballers
Churchill Brothers FC Goa players
Sporting Clube de Goa players
Footballers from Goa
I-League players
Association football central defenders
Fateh Hyderabad A.F.C. players
Indian Super League players
NorthEast United FC players
Real Kashmir FC players